Third Window Films is a UK-based distributor of movies from East Asia founded in 2005. They have provided distribution for numerous award-winning films, such as Oasis (Winner of Marcello Mastroianni Award, FIPRESCI Prize Signis Award and Special Director's Award at the Venice Film Festival),  Himizu (Winner of the Marcello Mastroianni Award at the Venice Film Festival), Villain (Best Actress winner at the Montreal World Film Festival), Kotoko (Winner of the Best Film Award in the Orrizonti of the Venice Film Festival), Memories of Matsuko (Best Actress, Best Editing and Best Music at Japan Academy Award and more.

Although receiving cult status in the UK for releasing such films as Love Exposure, Cold Fish, Fish Story, Tetsuo: The Iron Man and others, many of Third Window Films' titles are blockbusters that feature household names in their native countries. For instance, Guns & Talks features Korean idol Won Bin star of Mother, For Love's Sake by Takashi Miike played Out of Competition at the Cannes Film Festival, Vulgaria was the highest grossing Hong Kong film of 2012 and  Confessions held the number one spot in Japan for a whole month despite strong competition from Sex and the City 2 and Iron Man 2 and was Japan's official nomination for the 2010 Academy Awards.

In 2011, Third Window Films opened a branch office in Japan, Third Window Films Japan, to handle international co-productions. Their first co-production, The Land of Hope directed by Sion Sono, won the NETPAC Award at the Toronto International Film Festival in 2012.

In 2013, they created the first international large-scale co-production for a Japanese comedy, with Yosuke Fujita's Fuku-chan of FukuFuku Flats. The project brought in Tucker Film in Italy, Joint Entertainment in Taiwan, Rapid Eye Movies in Germany and partnered them with Japan's TV Man Union and Phantom Films. Third Window Films setup distribution deals as well for all 5 countries.

In 2015, they fully produced the Japanese independent film Lowlife Love (Gesu no Ai) directed by Uchida Eiji. The film is a 100% production of Third Window Films and stars many well-known Japanese actors such as Denden, Shugo Oshinari, Kiyohiko Shibukawa, Kanji Tsuda, Yoshihiko Hosoda and Houka Kinoshita. It is scheduled for release in Japan and internationally in 2016.

References 

 "One of the world's finest DVD distribution labels" - Twitch Film http://twitchfilm.com/2012/12/third-window-films-gives-twitch-an-exclusive-peek-into-an-awesome-2013-tsukamoto-miike-kurosawa-more.html
 "Third Window unveils Japan, UK, Italy, Taiwan, Germany co-pro" - Screen International http://www.screendaily.com/news/third-window-unveils-japan-uk-italy-taiwan-germany-co-pro/5062731.article
 "Window, Joint partner on second Japanese film" - Film Business Asia http://www.filmbiz.asia/news/window-joint-partner-on-second-japanese-film
 "Label Conscious: Japanese Cinema through the Third Window" - VCinema http://www.vcinemashow.com/label-conscious-japanese-cinema-through-the-third-window/
 "Cult Connotations: The reception of Japanese films on DVD in the UK through NEO Magazine" - https://www.academia.edu/1840570/Cult_Connotations_The_reception_of_Japanese_films_on_DVD_in_the_UK_through_NEO_Magazine
 "New Sion Sono disaster drama Land Of Hope gets backing from UK's Third Window Films" - http://www.screendaily.com/news/production/new-sion-sono-disaster-drama-land-of-hope-gets-backing-from-uks-third-window-films/5036693.article
 "DVD Distribution and Marketing of Japanese Films in the UK: Researching Japanese Film Industries" - https://www.academia.edu/1919816/DVD_Distribution_and_Marketing_of_Japanese_Films_in_the_UK_Researching_Japanese_Film_Industries
 "Quirky Guys and Gals: Japanese Cinema through the Third Window" - https://www.academia.edu/3463946/Quirky_Guys_and_Gals_Japanese_Cinema_through_the_Third_Window_Asian_Cinema_Studies_Society_Conference_Hong_Kong_University_2012_

Film distributors of the United Kingdom